Deepti Convent School, Rayagada is a co-ed convent pre-Primary to Upper Primary English Medium School in the district of Rayagada, Odisha which is located in Raniguda area, Rayagada at Lat. 19° 9′ 28″ N & Lon. 83° 24′ 58″ E.

History
Established in the year 2003, the school offers kindergarten, primary and Upper Primary education with Classes I to X having Science and Arts stream at the senior secondary level. The school is affiliated under Indian Certificate of Secondary Education.

Facilities
The School facilitates the students with:

Science Lab::
with latest scientific apparatuses in the laboratories.

References

External links
 Official website of Rayagada district

Primary schools in India
High schools and secondary schools in Odisha
Christian schools in Odisha
Education in Rayagada district
Educational institutions established in 2003
2003 establishments in Orissa